Held Glacier is a tributary glacier, flowing east from the Anderson Heights to enter Shackleton Glacier just south of Epidote Peak, in the Queen Maud Mountains of Antarctica. It was named by the Advisory Committee on Antarctic Names for Lieutenant George B. Held of the U.S. Navy Civil Engineer Corps, a Public Works Officer at McMurdo Station during 1964.

References

Glaciers of Dufek Coast